Josta Dladla (born 13 July 1979, Soweto, Gauteng) is a South African football (soccer) midfielder for National First Division club Moroka Swallows and South Africa.

Early life
Dladla was born in Soweto and lived with his grandmother. His first pair of boots were the Puma Jomo Sono King and they were given to him by a family friend in 1986. He attended the Tsugang Primary School in Soweto. His father worked in England and he boarded a flight for the first time when he was in Grade 8 in 1995 when he went to visit him during the December holidays.

Club career
He joined Wits in 1999 when he was still in high school and wore number 21 which was available and earned R1000,00 a month. Dladla made his professional debut against AmaZulu in a 1–1 draw on 19 December 1999. Dladla received attention for his remarkable playmaking prowess, and was eventually sold to AGF Aarhus at the end of the 2001/02 campaign. He made his debut two weeks later, scoring in a 4–3 win over Viborg, helping them to their first win in a month. Fellow countryman Sibusiso Zuma also scored for his club against Esjberg. Dladla, by Danish newspapers was said to have outshined Zuma, Dladla also went on to say "What's all this fuss about Sibusiso Zuma? I'm better than him!". He played his last match for Aarhus against the same team he debuted against Viborg FF on 29 May 2004 losing 2–0. He joined Mamelodi Sundowns in 2004, where he scored 15 goals in 122 appearances and won the SAA Supa8, Nedbank Cup and two league titles. He played his debut on 7 February 2009 in a 2–1 loss over Moroka Swallows. He scored his first goal on 29 November 2011 in a 3–0 win over Bidvest Wits from a solo run from the centre into the box in the 90th minute.

Statistics

Club

International career
Dladla was the 138th player to be capped for South Africa after isolation. He earned six caps, all as a substitute.

Personal life
Dladla has a tattoo from his wrist to his shoulder on the right arm. He has body art called a sleeve and has the names of his wife, Thato and his son, Xavier who was born in 2006.

Style of play
Danish soccer writer, Hans Christian Blem stated that Dladla is Very quick and has excellent technique. Stuart Baxter said the following in a Citypress interview comparing Dladla to Ryan Giggs. "We wouldn't extend his contract if we didn't think he would become the Ryan Giggs of Chiefs, Josta can play wide, central, off the strikers and Josta shows that he has Giggs' resilience. He can be a substitute, start the match and still be a team player.

References

External links 
 
 Official Danish league stats

1979 births
Living people
Sportspeople from Soweto
South African soccer players
Aarhus Gymnastikforening players
Mamelodi Sundowns F.C. players
Bidvest Wits F.C. players
Association football midfielders
Kaizer Chiefs F.C. players
South Africa international soccer players